Jucimara Evangelista Dantas (born 4 February 1978) is a Brazilian basketball player. She competed in the women's tournament at the 2008 Summer Olympics.

References

External links
 

1978 births
Living people
Brazilian women's basketball players
Olympic basketball players of Brazil
Basketball players at the 2008 Summer Olympics
People from Ilha Solteira
Sportspeople from São Paulo (state)